Voltaggio (Ottaggio in Ligurian) is a comune (municipality) in the Province of Alessandria in the Italian region Piedmont, located about  southeast of Turin and about  southeast of Alessandria.

Located there is a Roman bridge on the Lemme stream.

See also 
 Parco naturale delle Capanne di Marcarolo

References